Bonch-Bruyevich or Bonch-Bruevich is a double-barreled surname. Its first part indicates the Polish Bończa coat of arms and it is derived from the historical compound Polish family name "Brujewicz of Bończa c.o.a."

Notable people with the surname include:
Alexey Bonch-Bruyevich (1916-2006), Soviet physicist, expert in quantum electronics and physical optics, recipient of the USSR State Prize (1974), son of Mikhail
Mikhail Aleksandrovich Bonch-Bruevich (1888-1940), Soviet engineer, pioneer of Soviet radio engineering
Mikhail Dmitriyevich Bonch-Bruyevich (1870-1956), Imperial Russian and Soviet military commander, brother of Vladimir
Nikolai Bonch-Bruyevich, Russian architect of Poltava Cadets Corps in 1840
Vladimir Bonch-Bruyevich (1873-1955), Soviet politician, historian and writer, Old Bolshevik.  Author of one of canonical Soviet books about Vladimir Lenin, brother of Mikhail.

See also
12657 Bonch-Bruevich, an asteroid named after Alexey Bonch-Bruyevich